Thomas Henderson Murray (September 8, 1874 – August 27, 1935) was an American film actor and musician. He appeared in thirteen films between 1922 and 1931, including roles in two Charlie Chaplin films and was a member of Hillbilly country music groups in the early 30s. Born in Stonefort, Illinois and died in Hollywood, California of stomach cancer. He was married to Louise Carver.

Filmography

Music career 
He was part of 2 hillbilly music groups, the Beverly Hill Billies and the Hollywood Hillbillies that was also known as Uncle Tom Murray's Hollywood Hillbillies. Roy Rogers and Shug Fisher were one-time members of the Hollywood Hillbillies.

References

External links

1874 births
1935 deaths
American male film actors
American male silent film actors
20th-century American male actors
Male actors from Illinois